The Guild of St George is a charitable Education Trust, based in England but with a worldwide membership, which tries to uphold the values and put into practice the ideas of its founder, John Ruskin (1819–1900).

History
Ruskin, a Victorian polymath, established the Guild in the 1870s. Founded as St George's Company in 1871, it adopted its current name and constitution in 1878. Ruskin, the most influential art critic of his day, had turned increasingly to social concerns from the 1850s. His highly influential critique of Victorian political economy, Unto This Last, was serialised in 1860, and published with an additional preface in book-form in 1862. In lectures, letters and other published writings, he used his considerable rhetorical skills to denounce modern, industrial capitalism, and the theorists and politicians who served it. He considered that the ugliness, pollution and poverty it caused were undermining the nation. His deeply felt moral conviction that human society and the natural environment had been corrupted and ruptured motivated him to seek practical means of redemption, reform and reconstruction.

Through the Guild, which married medieval (i.e. pre-industrial) values and a progressive belief in social improvement, Ruskin hoped to establish communities to challenge the profit-motive driving modern industry, and to provide alternatives to mass production. He drew inspiration from medieval craft guilds, and was influenced by his particular interest in the cultural history of Venice.

His utopian ideal was to stimulate greater happiness and improved health by promoting sound and responsible personal conduct, and by reconnecting society with the ennobling beauty of nature. By means of his "Letters to the Workmen and Labourers of Great Britain," Fors Clavigera (1871–1884), he sought to recruit "Companions" (the name he gave to members of the Guild) to join him in an effort to establish "a National Store instead of a National Debt". As the Guild’s Master, Ruskin endowed it with a tithe, or personal donation, of £7000. He set about acquiring land which could be cultivated sustainably, as far as possible using traditional methods (hand-labour, wind and water-power), and assembling an educational collection of beautiful and precious books, art-works and other objects.

In principle, Ruskin worked out different grades of "Companion" for his hierarchical Guild. He also wrote codes of practice, described styles of dress and even designed the Guild’s own coins. He also wished to establish St George’s Schools, and published various volumes to aid its teaching (his Bibliotheca Pastorum or Shepherd’s Library), but the schools, like the dress and coins, never materialised. In part, this is because soon after Ruskin started the Guild he began to show signs of emotional disturbance and in 1878 suffered the first of a series of mental breakdowns that increasingly limited his activity.  In reality, the Guild has always operated on a modest scale, its activities being suggestive rather than transformational, but always dynamic, adapting to changing circumstances and needs.

Since 1871, some of the Guild's Companions have included: Lord Courtauld-Thomson, W. G. Collingwood, Sir Emery Walker, Sir Hubert Llewellyn Smith, Sir Evelyn Wrench,  Emily Warren, William Lethaby, Alfred Hoare Powell, Almyra Gray, Katharine Harris Bradley, J. Howard Whitehouse, John Henry Chamberlain, Frances Colenso, Benjamin Creswick, Frederick Leach, William Monk, Sydney Morse, William Smart, Fanny Talbot, T. Edmund Harvey  and Victor Branford.

Land and education
The Board of Trade recognised the Guild on 25 October 1878, granting it legal status, so all of its land and property was incorporated in 1879, but Ruskin had already made purchases and some donations had been provisionally accepted.

In 1876, Ruskin purchased land in Totley (Ruskin called it Abbeydale), near Sheffield. It was named (and is still called) St George’s Farm. The early work of this co-operative farming scheme met with only limited success, undermined by a series of disagreements (see William Harrison Riley). It was run as a moderately successful market garden and nursery for fifty years until 1938 (but had been sold by the Guild to its manager, George Pearson, in 1929). In 1878 Ruskin purchased a smallholding of 13 acres, with a cottage, originally for the occupation of John Guy and his family, at Cloughton Moor, in North Yorkshire. The Guys moved in 1882, and the land was sold in 1910.

Donations from wealthy and committed Companions placed several parcels of land and various properties in the Guild’s care:
eight cottages on a steep hillside at Barmouth, north-west Wales donated by Mrs Fanny Talbot in 1872 (sold by the Guild to the local council in 1972);
20 acres of woodland in the Wyre Forest, near Bewdley, Worcestershire (increased from an original offer of seven acres in 1871) was donated in 1877 by George Baker (the Guild's second Master, 1900–1910). St George’s Farm was built here in 1907-8. More land was bought by Guild Companions eager to live a "Ruskinian" life, notably those involved in the Liverpool Ruskin Society. As such, by 1889, Thomas and Margaret Harley (née Cox) established a fruit farm on land bought from Baker (St John's Cottage); Companion and Guild historian, Edith Hope Scott, settled at a cottage, Atholgarth, in the Wyre Forest (from 1908); Harrison and Margaret Fowler settled at Oak Grove (1912–1920); Uncllys Farm and some adjacent land was purchased by the Guild in 1929. More land was acquired by the Guild in the 1930s (St George's Bungalow was built in 1938), and the Guild remains a significant presence today in the Wyre Forest; Ruskinland is a national nature reserve;
a field of limestone grassland (St George's Field) at Sheepscombe, Gloucestershire (now an "unimproved" (unspoilt) national nature reserve) donated by Margaret E. Knight in 1936–37;
nine arts-and-crafts-style houses in Westmill, near Buntingford, Hertfordshire, bequeathed by Mrs Mary Hope Greg (1850–1949), whose husband's family owned Quarry Bank Mill at Styal, in Cheshire. All but two, which were sold, remain in the Guild’s hands. (A generous benefactor, Mrs Greg, who became a companion in the 1930s, gifted to the Guild her own nature diaries and other precious items, and Green Pastures bungalow in Holcombe, near Bath (sold in 1962-3)).

Ruskin also wished to see traditional rural handicrafts revived. St George’s Mill was established at Laxey, on the Isle of Man, producing cloth goods. Furthermore, Ruskin encouraged independent, but allied, efforts in spinning and weaving at Langdale, in other parts of the Lake District and elsewhere, producing linen and other goods exhibited by the Home Arts and Industries Association and similar organisations. The Guild became a registered charity on 5 January 1971.

Museum
In Sheffield, in 1875, Ruskin established St George's Museum for the working men of that city and surrounding areas (and particularly for Sheffield’s iron workers whom he much admired). Originally situated on high ground on Bell Hagg Road, in Walkley, north-west Sheffield, at the cottage occupied by its first curator (until 1889) Henry Swan, the museum, which was free to enter, was open until 9pm, on Sunday afternoons and by appointment to maximise its accessibility for working people. It housed the increasingly bountiful collection of artworks (pencil sketches, architectural drawings, watercolours, copies of Old Masters and so on), minerals, geological specimens, casts of sculpture, manuscripts (most of them medieval in origin), books (many of them rare) and a multitude of other beautiful and precious items. Through the Museum, Ruskin aimed to bring to the working man many of the sights and experiences otherwise confined to the wealthy who could afford to travel through Europe. (The original Museum has been recreated "virtually" online.) In 1890, the newly styled Ruskin Museum relocated to Meersbrook Park, and remained there until 1950. After a period of great uncertainty, the Guild collection was kept in the library at Reading University from 1964. However, the collection returned to Sheffield in 1981, and was displayed at the Ruskin Gallery situated in the former Hayes Wine Store on Norfolk Street from 1985 to 2001.

The Guild today
In 2001, the Guild’s collection moved to the Ruskin Gallery in Sheffield’s new Millennium Galleries. In 2011, the gallery was re-named the Ruskin Collection.

The Guild strives to maintain Ruskin’s principles and achieve his aims in the twenty-first century. It is funding a nine-year cycle of Triennial Exhibitions there. The Guild still manages and lets its properties at Westmill in line with Ruskin’s notions of care and justice (charging fair rents and diligently maintaining the properties). One hundred acres of ancient woodland and two smallholdings near Bewdley are sympathetically cultivated. A rebuilt barn, called the "Ruskin Studio", acts as a base for the Wyre Community Land Trust, which engages with a wide range of local projects, promoting rural crafts and skills, hosting events and receiving educational visits. The Guild funded the national Campaign for Drawing and is still associated with it; arts and crafts and rural economy are fostered; scholarships and awards are sometimes granted; and symposia are held to discuss issues of contemporary concern and debate.

The Guild is run by a Board of Directors, a secretary, and a Master who meet several times a year. Every autumn, Companions attend an Annual General Meeting, which hosts the Ruskin Lecture which is usually published by the Guild, like its journal, The Companion. The Guild's current Companions include Ewan Anderson, Chris Baines, David Ogilvy Barrie, Dinah Birch, Sir Quentin Blake, Peter Burman, Suzanne Fagence Cooper, Peter Day, Frank Field, Lord Field of Birkenhead, Dame Fiona Reynolds, Jeffrey Richards, Julian Spalding, Stephen Wildman, and Clive Wilmer.

In April 2021 the Isle of Man post office issued a set of six Ruskin commemorative stamps to mark the 150th anniversary of the Guild.

Masters

References

Bibliography
 Barnes, Janet, Ruskin in Sheffield (Museums Sheffield, 2011).
 Dearden, James Shackley, John Ruskin's Guild of St George (Guild of St George, 2010).
 Harris, Anthony, Why have our little girls large shoes? Ruskin and The Guild of St George (Guild of St George, 1985; new edn, 2011).
 Hewison, Robert, Art and Society: Ruskin in Sheffield, 1876 (2nd edn, Guild of St George, 2011).
 Morley, Catherine W., John Ruskin: Late Work 1870-1890 (Garland Publishing, 1984).
 Roll of Companions of the Guild of St George (Guild of St George, 2013)
 Scott, Edith Hope, Ruskin's Guild of St George (Methuen, 1931).
 Waithe, Marcus, Ruskin at Walkley: An Illustrated Guide to the Online Museum (Brentham Press for the Guild of St George, 1989; revised edn, Guild of St George, 2011).
 Wardle, Peter and Quayle, Cedric, Ruskin and Bewdley (Guild of St George, 2007).

External links
  
 Online reconstruction of Ruskin's original St George's Museum at Walkley, Sheffield
 Sources for the study of John Ruskin and the history of the Guild of St George Produced by Sheffield City Council's Libraries and Archives

1871 establishments in England
Charities based in England
John Ruskin
Organizations established in 1871
Guilds in England
Guild of St George